is a Japanese comedian who performs boke in the comedy duo Black Mayonnaise. His standing position is in the right. His partner is Ryuichi Kosugi. He is represented with Yoshimoto Kogyo.

Awards

Filmography

TV series

Films

Advertisements

Image characters

Music videos

Bibliography

References

External links
 at Yoshimoto Kogyo 

Japanese comedians
Japanese television presenters
People from Kyoto
1973 births
Living people